Apiospora montagnei is a plant pathogen that causes kernel blight on barley but is more often seen a saprophyte or secondary invader of many other plant species.

References

External links 
 Index Fungorum
 USDA ARS Fungal Database

Fungal plant pathogens and diseases
Barley diseases
Sordariomycetes enigmatic taxa
Fungi described in 1875